Christel Maria Marian (4 June 1954) is a German chemist. She is a full professor and the director of the institute of theoretical and computational chemistry at the University of Düsseldorf.

Education and professional life 
Marian studied chemistry in Cologne and Bonn. She finished her doctorate in Theoretical Chemistry at the University of Bonn under the supervision of Sigrid D. Peyerimhoff in 1980. She did a postdoc in the Theoretical Physics Department of Stockholm University (Sweden) in the group of Per E. M. Siegbahn. She completed her habilitation at the University of Bonn in 1991. In 2001, she joined the University of Düsseldorf as a full professor. Between 2011 and 2015, she was Dean of the Mathematical and Natural Science Faculty at the University of Düsseldorf.

Personal life 
She has two daughters.

Research 
Her research focuses on the development and application of theoretical and computational excited-state electronic structure methods – also for biomolecules. She also worked on spin-orbit coupling in molecules.

Selected publications 
Some of her most cited publications are:

Awards 
She is a member of the North Rhine-Westphalian Academy of Sciences, Humanities and the Arts.

References

1954 births
20th-century German chemists
German women chemists
Living people
Theoretical chemists
20th-century German women scientists
21st-century German chemists